Unexpected Conflict (Spanish: Conflicto inesperado) is a 1948 Spanish comedy film directed by Ricardo Gascón and starring Amedeo Nazzari, María Asquerino and Alfonso Estela. It was one of several films the Italian star Nazzari made in Spain in the late 1940s. The film was made by the Barcelona-based PESCA Films rather than in the major Madrid studios.

Plot

Cast

References

Bibliography
 de España, Rafael. Directory of Spanish and Portuguese film-makers and films. Greenwood Press, 1994. 
 Lancia, Enrico. Amedeo Nazzari. Gremese Editore, 1983.

External links 

1948 films
1948 comedy films
Spanish comedy films
1940s Spanish-language films
Spanish films based on plays
Films directed by Ricardo Gascón
Spanish black-and-white films
1940s Spanish films